Nationalsånger – Hymner från Vågen och EPAs torg is an album recorded and released in 2002 by several of Sweden's most noteworthy artists as a tribute to the Swedish progg band Nationalteatern. The booklet also contains notes from some of the artists and others about their personal relationships with Nationalteatern's music.

Track listing
 Sent En Lördagskväll From the 1980 release "Rövarkungens ö", performed by the rock band The Hellacopters.
 Bängen Trålar (Anders Melander) From "Livet är en fest" released in 1974, performed by The Soundtrack of Our Lives and Nina Persson.
 Jack The Ripper (Anders Melander) From the 1974 album "Livet är en fest", performed by the Backyard Babies.
 Kolla Kolla (Anders Melander) From the 1978 album "Barn av vår tid" and performed by The Ark.
 En Dag På Sjön (Ulf Dageby) From Ulf Dageby's solo album with the same name released in 1983, performed by Pelle Ossler.
 Barn Av Vår Tid (Ulf Dageby) From the album with the same title performed by Lennart Eriksson, Dogge Doggelito and The Diamond Dogs.
 Lägg Av! (Anders Melander) Released in 1974 on "Livet är en fest" and performed by hardcore band LOK.
 Hanna Från Arlöv (Ulf Dageby) From the 1974 album "Livet är en fest" performed by Lisa Miskovsky and Christian Kjellvander.
 Speedy Gonzales (Anders Melander) Released in 1974 on the album "Livet är en fest", performed by Stefan Sundström and Weeping Willows.
 Aldrig Mera Krig (Ulf Dageby, Peter Wahlqvist) From the tent show "Vi äro tusenden" released on record in 1977, performed by Bob Hansson and Moder Jords Massiva.
 Men Bara Om Min Älskade Väntar (Bob Dylan, Ulf Dageby) A translation of Bob Dylan's "Tomorrow is a long time" released on the album "Barn av vår tid", performed by Uno Svenningsson and Sophie Zelmani.
 Ut I Kylan (Ulf Dageby) Originally released in 1972 on the album "Ta det som ett löfte.....ta det inte som ett hot", performed by MLB & Ulf Dageby.
 Popens Mussolinis From the 1978 album "Barn av vår tid", performed by Regina Lund and Conny Bloom.
 Livet Är En Fest (Ulf Dageby) Originally released on the 1974 album with the same name, performed by Lambretta.

External links
Official Nationalteatern Website

Tribute albums
2002 compilation albums